Shukul Bazar, also called Bazar Shukul or more rarely Mawaiya-Rahmatgarh, is a town and community development block in Musafirkhana tehsil of Sultanpur district, Uttar Pradesh, India. It is located on the road from Inhauna to Rudauli.

At the turn of the 20th century, Shukul Bazar was described as the only real town in the otherwise mostly rural tehsil of Musafirkhana. It had an important market and was the headquarters of a police thana which, despite its small jurisdiction, was very busy due to a lot of unrest in the area. It also had a post office and one of the largest schools in the tehsil.

The market at Shukul Bazar is held on Wednesdays and Sundays and mostly deals in cloth. As of 1961, it had an average attendance of around 500 people. At that point, the town also had a government-run dispensary with 2 beds for males and 2 for females, and it had a police force consisting of 1 sub-inspector, 1 head constable, and 12 constables.

Villages
Shukul Bazar CD block has the following 71 villages:

References

Cities and towns in Sultanpur district
Community development blocks in India